The RAM 01 is an open-wheel Formula One race car built by British team and constructor RAM team in .

Design and development
The 01 was the first car built by the British team to participate in the 1983 Formula One world championship.

The chassis frame, an evolution of that of the March 821, was of the aluminum monocoque type, while the braking system was composed of four ventilated disc brakes. The suspension consisted of double wishbones and shock absorbers with coil springs.

Racing history
With constant driver changes Eliseo Salazar, Jean-Louis Schlesser, Jacques Villeneuve, Sr., and Kenny Acheson, the team only managed to qualify twice, in the first and last races of the season.

References 

RAM Formula One cars